Arslan Aydemirovich Aydemirov (born 1 August 1977) is a former Russian professional football player.

Club career
He played in the Russian Football National League for FC Petrotrest St. Petersburg in 2005.

References

External links
 

1977 births
Footballers from Makhachkala
Living people
Russian footballers
Association football midfielders
FC Petrotrest players
FC Torpedo Vladimir players
FC Dynamo Makhachkala players